Mahir Jasem Ghuloom Abdulla Al-Haffar (born 22 January 1989) is an Emirati footballer. He played for the UAE national under-20 side  and Al Dhaid.

Maher was one of the youngsters nicknamed "The Dream Team" by AlWasl Club's fans as they were able to win each League competition they participated throughout their youth competition years.

References

External links
 

1991 births
Living people
Emirati footballers
Association football forwards
Sportspeople from Dubai
Al-Wasl F.C. players
Al-Shaab CSC players
Hatta Club players
Al Hamriyah Club players
Al Dhaid SC players
UAE First Division League players
UAE Pro League players